The 56th Berlin International Film Festival was held from 9 to 19 February 2006. The festival opened with Snow Cake by Marc Evans. Digitally restored version of Sam Peckinpah's 1972 film Pat Garrett and Billy the Kid served as the closing film. British actress Charlotte Rampling was selected as the head of the jury. The Golden Bear was awarded to Grbavica: The Land of My Dreams directed by Jasmila Žbanić.

The retrospective was dedicated to the film actresses of 1950s, titled Dream Girls. Film Stars in the 1950s was shown at the festival. More than 186,000 tickets were sold at the festival with visitors from 120 countries, including 3,800 journalists, attended the festival.

Jury

The following people were announced as being on the jury for the festival:

International Jury
 Charlotte Rampling, actress (United Kingdom) - Jury President
 Matthew Barney, director and multimedia artist (United States)
 Yash Chopra, director and producer (India)
 Marleen Gorris,  director (Netherlands)
 Janusz Kamiński, director of photography (Poland)
 Armin Mueller-Stahl, actor (Germany)
 Fred Roos, producer (United States)
 Lee Young-ae, actress (South Korea)

Best First Feature Award Jury
 Valentina Cervi, actress (Italy)
 Goran Paskaljević, director (Serbia and Montenegro)
 Hans Weingartner, director and producer (Austria)

International Short Film Jury
 Mariela Besuievsky, producer (Spain)
 Florian Gallenberger, director and screenwriter (Germany)
 Jung-Wan Oh, producer (South Korea)

In competition
The following films were in competition for the Golden Bear and Silver Bear awards:

Key
{| class="wikitable" width="550" colspan="1"
| style="background:#FFDEAD;" align="center"| †
|Winner of the main award for best film in its section
|-
| colspan="2"| The opening and closing films are screened during the opening and closing ceremonies respectively.
|}

Awards

The following prizes were awarded by the Jury:
Golden Berlin Bear:
Grbavica: The Land of My Dreams by Jasmila Žbanić
Best Short Film – Never Like the First Time! by Jonas Odell
Silver Berlin Bear:
Best Film Music – Isabella by Peter Kam
Best Actor – Moritz Bleibtreu for The Elementary Particles
Best Actress – Sandra Hüller for Requiem
Best Director – Michael Winterbottom & Mat Whitecross for The Road to Guantanamo
Best Short Film – Penpusher by Guillaume Martinez
Outstanding Artistic Contribution – Jürgen Vogel for The Free Will
Jury Grand Prix – En soap by Pernille Fischer Christensen
Honorable Mention:
Short Film – Maryam Keshavarz for El día que morí
Honorary Golden Berlin Bear:
Andrzej Wajda
Ian McKellen
Berlinale Camera:
Michael Ballhaus
Jürgen Böttcher
Laurence Kardish
Peter B. Schumann
Hans Helmut Prinzler
Best Debut Film:
En soap by Pernille Fischer Christensen (director) & Lars Bredo Rahbek (producer)
Panorama Audience Award:
Tomer Heymann for Paper Dolls
Short Film – Talya Lavie for The Substitute
Crystal Bear:
Best Short Film – Cameron B. Alyasin for Never an Absolution
Best Feature Film – Niels Arden Oplev for We Shall Overcome
14Plus: Best Feature Film – Henry Meyer for Four Weeks in June
Crystal Bear – Special Mention:
Best Short Film: Irina Boiko for The Thief
Best Feature Film: Auraeus Solito for The Blossoming of Maximo Oliveros
14Plus: Best Feature Film: Claude Gagnon for Kamataki
Deutsches Kinderhilfswerk Grand Prix:
The Blossoming of Maximo Oliveros by Auraeus Solito
Deutsches Kinderhilfswerk – Special Award:
A Fish with a Smile by C. Jay Shih
Deutsches Kinderhilfswerk – Special Mention:
Best Short Film – Vika by Tsivia Barkai
Best Feature Film – I Am by Dorota Kędzierzawska
Teddy:
Best Short Film – El día que morí by Maryam Keshavarz
Best Documentary Film – Beyond Hatred by Olivier Meyrou
Best Feature Film – The Blossoming of Maximo Oliveros by Auraeus Solito
Teddy Jury Award:
Patrick Carpentier for Combat
FIPRSECI Prize:
Competition – Requiem by Hans-Christian Schmid
Forum of New Cinema – So Yong Kim for In Between Days
Panorama – Knallhart by Detlev Buck
Prize of the Ecumenical Jury:
Competition – Grbavica: The Land of My Dreams by Jasmila Žbanić
Forum of New Cinema – Conversations on a Sunday Afternoon by Khalo Matabane
Panorama – The Collector by Feliks Falk
C.I.C.A.E. Award:
Forum of New Cinema – Close to Home by Dalia Hager
Panorama – Zhang Yuan for Little Red Flowers
Netpac Award:
Dear Pyongyang by Yong-hi Yang
Prix UIP Berlin:
The Fence by Ricardo Íscar
Alfred Bauer Prize:
Rodrigo Moreno for El custodio
Label Europa Cinemas:
Detlev Buck for Knallhart
Caligari Film Award:
Ben Hopkins for 37 Uses for a Dead Sheep
DIALOGUE en Perspective:
Bülent Akinci for Running on Empty
DIALOGUE en Perspective – Special Mention:
Florian Gaag for Wholetrain
Talent Movie of the Week:
Phillip Van for High Maintenance
Berlin Today Award:
Anna Azevedo for BerlinBall
Score Competition:
Alasdair Reid
Manfred Salzgeber Award:
Tomer Heymann for Paper Dolls
Panorama Short Film Award:
Tala Hadid for Your Dark Hair Ihsan
DAAD Short Film Award:
Rony Sasson for Swanettes
Peace Film Award:
Jasmila Žbanić for Grbavica: The Land of My Dreams
Amnesty International Film Prize:
Masoud Arif Salih for Narcissus Blossom
Wolfgang Staudte Award:
Tizza Covi for Babooska
Prize of the Guild of German Art House Cinemas:
Matthias Glasner for The Free Will
Femina-Film-Prize:
Yasmin Khalifa for Bye Bye Berlusconi!
Reader Jury of the "Berliner Morgenpost":
Robert Altman for A Prairie Home Companion
Reader Jury of the "Berliner Zeitung":
Shion Sono for Strange Circus
Reader Jury of the "Siegessäule":
Tomer Heymann for Paper Dolls

References

External links
 56th Berlin International Film Festival 2006
 56th Berlin International Film Festival at the IMDb
 Official website of program

56
2006 film festivals
2006 festivals in Europe
2006 in Berlin
2006 in German cinema